Wally Kennedy is a Philadelphia television and radio announcer. He hosted AM Philadelphia (later AM Live), Philly After Midnight, and Inside Story on WPVI-TV over a twenty-year period.

Early life 
He is a native of Chicago, where he graduated from Columbia College Chicago.

Career 
His programs won their respective time periods in the Nielsen ratings, remaining the most successful talk programs in the TV market. He hosted a local, news-driven Sunday morning talk program, Sunday Live, on WPVI. He was among a handful of broadcasters to be honored by the Philadelphia City Council for outstanding service. He appeared on CNN, NBC and ABC television networks, at different times, to discuss stories he covered.

Kennedy was profiled in Philadelphia Magazine, The Philadelphia Inquirer, The Philadelphia Daily News and Philadelphia City Paper. In 2004, he left WPVI and joined the faculty at Temple University's School of Journalism as an adjunct professor. Prior to WPVI, he was at WCAU in Philadelphia and WSB Radio in Atlanta.

He has been an anchor for KYW NewsRadio 1060 since 2006. He is also currently an adjunct professor at Immaculata University.

Following his selection by the board of directors, Kennedy was inducted into the Broadcast Pioneers of Philadelphia "Hall of Fame" in 2011.

Personal life
Kennedy lives in Chester County, Pennsylvania with his wife, and has three grown children.

References

External links

1948 births
Living people
American radio personalities
Television anchors from Philadelphia